Endotricha minutiptera is a species of snout moth in the genus Endotricha. It was described by Hou-Hun Li in 2009, and is known from Hainan, China.

The wingspan is 11-11.5 mm. The forewings are grayish black, with scattered reddish-purple scales. The hindwings are black, covered with reddish purple.

References

Moths described in 2009
Endotrichini